Bicycle taxi may refer to:
 Boda-boda
 Cycle rickshaw